Acoustics is an album by American guitarist Tony Rice, originally released on November 30, 1978. The album was recorded soon after Rice left the David Grisman Quintet to pursue his own music. On Acoustics, he merges genres such as jazz, bluegrass, and folk, to create a new genre which would later come to be known as "new acoustic music."

Track listing 
All songs by Tony Rice unless otherwise noted.
 "Gasology" – 5:15
 "Blues for Paradise" – 3:43
 "Old Gray Coat" – 3:53
 "Four on Six" (Wes Montgomery) – 3:41
 "So Much" – 5:09
 "Swing '51" – 3:10
 "New Waltz" (Rice, Mike Marshall) – 5:10
 "Fast Floyd" – 3:19

Personnel
Tony Rice – guitar, vocals
Richard Greene – violin
Sam Bush – mandolin
David Grisman – mandolin
Mike Marshall – mandolin
Todd Phillips – bass
Production notes
Tony Rice – producer
Bill Wolf – engineer

References

1978 albums
Tony Rice albums
Rounder Records albums